The Queyras is a valley located in the French Hautes-Alpes, of which the geographical extent is the basin of the river Guil, a tributary of the Durance. The Queyras is one of the oldest mountain ranges of the Alps, and it was one of the last ones to be opened to public tourism towards the end of the 20th century, thus being relatively untouched by environmental destruction.

Notable mountains around the valley include:  
 The Taillante
 The Pic de Rochebrune – 3.324 m
 The Grand Queyras – 3.114 m
 The Pic de Petit Rochebrune – 3.078 m
 The Bric Bouchet
 The Pain de Sucre (literally translating as "Sugar Loaf" due to its distinct shape, similar to the Sugarloaf in Rio de Janeiro).

There are two passes leading into the valley:
Col Agnel
Col d'Izoard

See also 
 128633 Queyras, asteroid named after the valley

External links 

 Official information on activities in the Queyras

Landforms of Hautes-Alpes
Landforms of Provence-Alpes-Côte d'Azur
Valleys of France